(BAO) was an early attempt to establish modern banking in the Horn of Africa at a time when Eritrea and Italian Somaliland were Italian colonies. It closed in 1923.

History

During early WW1, the Italian government wanted the creation of a local bank in the Italian colonies of eastern Africa. It was the first tentative to create a modern banking system in all colonial Africa. In 1914 the central "Bank of Italy" started to operate in Asmara and promoted the creation of private banks — like the "BAO" — in the Italian colonies. The  (BIS) was a leading Italian bank that indirectly supported the BAO, but BSI failed in 1921, leading to the failure of the BAO a few years later.

1917 -BIS promoted the formation of the Banca per l’Africa Orientale as a joint stock company in Rome. 
1918 - BAO commenced operations with head office in Massawa and a branch in Mogadishu that was the first bank in Somalia.  

In late 1923 the Banca per l'Africa Orientale was officially closed.

Notes

Bibliography
 Falchero, Maria. La Banca Italiana di Sconto, 1914-1921. Sette anni di guerra Franco Angeli. Milano, 1990 
 Mauri, Arnaldo (1998), "The First Monetary and Banking Experiences in Eritrea". African Review of Money, Finance and Banking, n. 1-2: pp. 67-84.

See also
 Africa Orientale Italiana
 Banca Italiana di Sconto

Economy of Eritrea
History of Eritrea
Companies of Eritrea
Companies of Somalia
Economic history of Somalia
Massawa
1917 establishments in Italy

it:Africa Orientale Italiana#Banca per l'Africa Orientale